Santos F.C.S. is a football club located in Siguatepeque, Honduras, that competes in the Liga de Ascenso, the second tier of the Honduran football league system.

History
Santos F.C.S. was founded on 25 July 2017.  In July 2018, they purchased Atlético Municipal's franchise and began playing at the Liga de Ascenso for the 2018–19 season.  Before the start of the 2020–21 season, they sold their franchise to Sabá F.C. and ceased operations.

Performance by year

Stadium
Santos F.C.S. play their home matches at Estadio Roberto Martínez Ávila, located in Siguatepeque.

References

Football clubs in Honduras
Association football clubs established in 2017
2017 establishments in Honduras